This is a list of the winners of national and international auto racing championships and series which were contested during 1965.

Formula cars

Sports car

Touring car

Stock car racing

Motorcycle

See also
 List of motorsport championships
 Auto racing

1965 in motorsport
1965